Michael Harry Schill (born September 30, 1958) is an American legal scholar and academic administrator currently serving as the 17th president of Northwestern University since September 2022.

Schill previously served as the 18th president of the University of Oregon from 2015 to 2022, dean of the University of Chicago Law School from 2009 to 2015, and dean of the UCLA School of Law from 2004 to 2009.

Schill is the author of three books and numerous articles, with foci of scholarship in the areas of real estate, housing policy, and discrimination in the housing market. His casebook, Property, co-authored with Jesse Dukeminier, James Krier, Greg Alexander, and Lior Strahilevitz is the best-selling casebook used in American law schools.

Early life and career
Schill was born in Schenectady, New York, to Simon Schill and the former Ruth Coplon. He was a first-generation college student and attended Linton High School and Princeton University, where he graduated with an A.B. from the Woodrow Wilson School of Public and International Affairs in 1980 after completing a 166-page long senior thesis titled "Reinvestment and Displacement: A Research Strategy." He received his J.D. from Yale Law School in 1984 where he was an editor of the Yale Law Journal. Immediately following his graduation from law school, he clerked for the Honorable Marvin Katz of the United States District Court for the Eastern District of Pennsylvania for the 1984 term. He practiced law at the law firm of Fried, Frank, Harris, Shriver and Jacobson from 1985 to 1987.

President of the University of Oregon 
On April 14, 2015, the UO Board of Trustees named Schill as the 18th president of the University of Oregon. He has focused on three priorities to advance the UO's mission: enhancing academic and research excellence, supporting student access and success, and improving campus experience and diversity and experience.

In 2016, Schill announced the launch of the Phil and Penny Knight Campus for Accelerating Scientific Impact, a billion dollar initiative to transform innovation at the UO. The first phase, anchored by a $500 million gift from the Knights, was completed in December 2020 with the grand opening of the campus’s first building. In July 2021, the UO received a second $500 million gift from Penny and Phil Knight to fund the next phase of the campus. Under Schill's leadership, the UO partnered with Oregon Health and Science University to seed new academic opportunities to benefit society and create a biomedical data science center focused on finding treatments and cures for cancer.

In 2021, Schill announced the university surpassed its $3 billion fundraising goal, a university and state record. During his time as president from 2015 to the end of the campaign, the University of Oregon raised $2.5 billion and extended its comprehensive campaign goal from $2 to $3 billion. The campaign was the largest in the university's history.

He announced the Oregon Commitment in 2015, an effort focused on supporting student success by improving four-year graduation rates and providing more access to higher education through programs such as PathwayOregon, which provides free tuition, fees, and specialized advising to eligible Oregonians. As part of this effort, Tykeson Hall opened in August 2019, home to two dozen new academic advisors trained in an integrated approach to providing academic and career-readiness support to students. The university reached the goal of improving four-year graduation rates by 10 percentage points a year early in 2019.

In an effort to encourage the exchange of ideas and make campus more inclusive and equitable, Schill held a series of events focused on freedom of expression, launched an African American speaker series, oversaw the development of thirty-four diversity action plans for each major administrative and academic unit on campus, and championed the creation of a new Black Cultural Center, which opened in 2019. Schill also recommended the denaming of two campus buildings to send a clear message that racism has no place at the UO and that the welfare, inclusion, and success of Black, indigenous, and other students, faculty, and staff of color is central to the university’s mission. In 2020, Schill and Provost Patrick Phillips announced a major initiative to hire more faculty of color and retain those already at the university, to establish a center on racial disparities, and to promote inclusion in the UO’s classrooms.

Legacy

During Schill's tenure as president, Philip Knight's influence increased, as did the influence other mega donors and private foundations have on the public university. Knight contributed $1 billion towards Phil and Penny Knight Campus for Accelerating Scientific Impact. Additionally, Steve Ballmer and family contributed $425 million towards an educational initiative and UO became a member of the $220 million Wu Tsai Human Performance Alliance. Furthermore, Knight continued to build controversial athletic facilities, this time on UO's main campus.

According to the publication The Chronicle of Higher Education, as of 2022, UO has received three of the top twenty largest gifts in higher education history. The Chronicle's list includes prominent global initiatives such as the Gates Millennium Scholars Program, and the George Soros funded Open Society University Network. All gifts were received during Schill's tenure as president.

President of Northwestern University 
On August 11, 2022, Schill was announced as the 17th president of Northwestern University, succeeding Morton O. Schapiro in the role. This happened one month after Rebecca M. Blank, who was also president-elect, announced she had an aggressive form of cancer that prohibited her from serving in the position, prompting the Board of Trustees to quickly look for a replacement. Schapiro offered to temporarily return to the office until Fall 2022, when Schill was to officially begin his presidency. Northwestern announced in February 2023 that Schill was to be inaugurated into his role that June.

Academic and decanal career
In 1987, Schill joined the faculty at the University of Pennsylvania Law School and the Wharton School. He served as assistant professor of law from 1987 to 1992, and became professor of law in 1992. From 1993 to 1995 he was professor of law and real estate. In 1995 he moved to the New York University School of Law and Wagner School of Public Service, becoming professor of law and urban planning. Simultaneously, he became the founding director of the Furman Center for Real Estate and Urban Policy. He held both positions until 2004, and in 2003 he additionally became the Wilf Family Professor in Property Law. 
 
In 2004, Schill became dean and professor of law at the University of California, Los Angeles School of Law. During his five and one-half years at UCLA, Schill recruited leading legal scholars from top schools across the nation and established thirteen endowed chairs. He launched three new legal research centers and two academic specialization programs. Alumni participation in fundraising doubled during his decanal tenure, and private philanthropy tripled. Schill served as Chair of the Council of Professional School Deans and sat on the UCLA Chancellor's Executive Committee.

During Schill's tenure as dean of the University of Chicago Law School in 2010, the Law School expanded its faculty, increased incoming student credentials to record levels, doubled fundraising and established new centers and curricula in law and economics, business leadership and public interest law. In addition to serving as Dean of the Law School, Schill was appointed Professor in the College where he taught a course in law and urban problems.

Schill is a co-author (with Jesse Dukeminier, James Krier, Greg Alexander, and Lior Strahilevitz) of Property, a major casebook now in its ninth edition. He has also co-authored Reducing the Cost of New Housing Construction in New York City: 2005 Update (Center For Real Estate and Urban Policy, 2005) (with Jerry Salama and Jonathan Springer), Revitalizing America’s Cities: Neighborhood Reinvestment and Displacement (State University of New York Press, 1983) (with Richard P. Nathan), and The State of New York City’s Housing and Neighborhoods, 2003, 2004, 2005 (Furman Center for Real Estate and Urban Policy) (with Denise Previti). He is also the editor of Housing and Community Development in New York City: Facing The Future (State University of New York Press, 1999). He has published more than 40 journal articles and book chapters.

Schill serves as Chair of the PAC-12 CEO Group and as a member of the Board of Governors for the NCAA. He is a member of the Board of Trustees of Ithaka Harbors, the nonprofit parent of JSTOR. He has served as a member of the New York City Loft Board, the New York City Neighborhood Investment Advisory Panel, the Fannie Mae New York Partnership Office, Housing Policy Debate and the Board of Governors of Argonne National Laboratory. He has also received research grants from the MacArthur Foundation, the Ford Foundation, and the United States Department of Commerce, among others.

Honors
In 2011, Schill was inducted as a Fellow of the American Academy of Arts and Sciences.

In April 2010, Schill was presented with the Impact Award for Excellence in Housing from New York City's Citizens Housing and Planning Council (CHPC). Schill was recognized for his work as the founding director of the Furman Center for Real Estate and Urban Policy. During the presentation of the Impact Award, Sarah Gerecke, then the executive director of the Furman Center, said of Schill, "Mike is a builder. His academic research built new ways of thinking about problems, ranging from fair housing to one government’s condemnation of another government’s land. He built confidence and critical thinking skills in all the students lucky enough to work with him. He built the foundation for change in his path-breaking policy analyses like reducing the cost of new construction in New York City. And he’s built institutions that have a far greater impact than they would without him."  Jerilyn Perine, executive director of the Citizens Housing & Planning Council, said "Mike’s work at Furman was marked by his careful, conducted research that policymakers and the public could always rely on. He was expert at vigorously defending his positions, but in the nicest possible way."

See also
 Real property

References

External links
 University of Chicago Law School faculty website
 University of Chicago Law School Launches Law & Economics 2.0 Initiative
 University of Chicago Law School Launches Law & Economics 2.0 Initiative
 Schill Appointed Next Dean of University of Chicago Law School
University of Oregon Office of the President website

1958 births
Living people
American legal scholars
Deans of law schools in the United States
Scholars of property law
People from Schenectady, New York
Presidents of Northwestern University
Presidents of the University of Oregon
UCLA School of Law faculty
University of Chicago Law School faculty
Princeton School of Public and International Affairs alumni
Yale University alumni
University of Pennsylvania Law School faculty
American university and college faculty deans
Fellows of the American Academy of Arts and Sciences